Yoshihara is a Japanese surname. Notable people with the surname include:

Daijiro Yoshihara (born 1978), Japanese racing driver
Jiro Yoshihara (1905–1972), Japanese painter
Kota Yoshihara (born 1978), Japanese footballer
Mari Yoshihara (born 1968), American academic
Masato Yoshihara (born 1991), Japanese footballer
Yoshihara Shigetoshi (1845–1887), Japanese diplomat
Shinya Yoshihara (born 1978), Japanese footballer
Tomoko Yoshihara (born 1970), Japanese volleyball player
Yukari Yoshihara (born 1973), Japanese Go player
Yoshindo Yoshihara  (born 1943), Japanese swordsmith
Nancy Yoshihara, American journalist and co-founder of the Asian American Journalists Association

Japanese-language surnames